Anton Žlogar (born 24 November 1977) is a former Slovenian footballer.

Playing career
Žlogar played for Primorje, Gorica, Olimpija, Paralimni, Anorthosis Famagusta, AC Omonia, Alki Larnaca, and Kras Repen.

He played for the Slovenia national football team and was a participant at Euro 2000.

Coaching career

On 25 November 2014, he became head coach of Kras. After the match against Gemonese (Gemonese won 2–1) on 13 March 2016, Žlogar resigned as head coach.

Honours

Gorica
Slovenian Cup: 2000–01

Olimpija
Slovenian Cup: 2002–03

Anorthosis Famagusta
Cypriot First Division: 2007–08
Cypriot Cup: 2006–07
Cyprus Super Cup: 2007

Omonia
Cypriot Championship: 2010

See also
Slovenian international players

References

External links
Player profile at NZS 
National team stats 

1977 births
Living people
People from Izola
Slovenian footballers
Association football midfielders
ND Gorica players
NK Olimpija Ljubljana (1945–2005) players
NK Primorje players
Slovenian expatriate footballers
Slovenian PrvaLiga players
Cypriot First Division players
Expatriate footballers in Cyprus
Slovenian expatriate sportspeople in Cyprus
Enosis Neon Paralimni FC players
Anorthosis Famagusta F.C. players
AC Omonia players
Alki Larnaca FC players
Expatriate footballers in Italy
Slovenian expatriate sportspeople in Italy
Slovenia youth international footballers
Slovenia under-21 international footballers
Slovenia international footballers
UEFA Euro 2000 players
Slovenian football managers
Slovenian expatriate football managers
Expatriate football managers in Italy